"The Only Living Boy in New Cross" is a song by English indie punk band Carter the Unstoppable Sex Machine. The title is a pun on Simon and Garfunkel's song "The Only Living Boy in New York", substituting the London area of New Cross. The song was released on 13 April 1992 on Chrysalis Records and reached number seven on the UK Singles Chart, making it the band's only top-10 single. It also charted in Australia and Ireland, peaking at number 70 on the Australian Singles Chart and number 18 on the Irish Singles Chart. In the United States, the song peaked at number 26 on the Billboard Modern Rock Tracks chart.

Track listing

Charts

References

1992 singles
1992 songs
Carter the Unstoppable Sex Machine songs
Chrysalis Records singles
Songs about London